The 1987 NCAA Women's Golf Championships were contested at the sixth annual NCAA-sanctioned golf tournament to determine the individual and team national champions of women's collegiate golf in the United States. Until 1996, the NCAA would hold just one annual women's golf championship for all programs across Division I, Division II, and Division III.

The tournament was held at the University of New Mexico Golf Course in Albuquerque, New Mexico.

San Jose State won the team championship, the Spartans' first.

Caroline Keggi, from New Mexico, won the individual title.

Individual results

Individual champion
 Caroline Keggi, New Mexico (289, −3)

Team results

 DC = Defending champion
 Debut appearance

References

NCAA Women's Golf Championship
Golf in New Mexico
NCAA Women's Golf Championship
NCAA Women's Golf Championship